Kęstutis (shortened as Kęstas) is a Lithuanian masculine given name and may refer to:
Kęstutis (c. 1297–1382), Lithuanian medieval monarch, Duke of Trakai and co-ruler of the Grand Duchy of Lithuania
Kęstutis Andziulis (born 1948), Lithuanian artist and art restorer
Kęstutis Antanėlis (born 1951), Lithuanian composer, architect and sculptor
Kęstutis Bartkėnas (born 1967), Lithuanian track and field athlete and Paralympic medalist
Kęstutis Bulota (1896–1941), Lithuanian multi-sport athlete and Olympic competitor
Kęstutis Dirgėla (born 1960), Lithuanian engineer and politician
Kęstutis Glaveckas (1949–2021), Lithuanian politician
Kęstutis Grinius (born 1956), Lithuanian politician
Kęstutis Ivaškevičius (born 1985), Lithuanian footballer
Kęstutis Kasparavičius (born 1954), Lithuanian author and book illustrator
Kęstutis Keblys (born 1976), Lithuanian rower and Olympic competitor
Kęstutis Kemzūra (born 1970), Lithuanian basketball player and coach
Kęstutis Kėvalas (born 1972), Lithianian Roman Catholic auxiliary Bishop of Kaunas
Kęstutis Krasauskas (born 1968), Lithuanian artist and sculptor
Kęstutis Lapinskas (born 1937), Lithuanian legal scholar
Kęstutis Latoža (born 1950), Lithuanian footballer and manager
Kęstutis Lupeikis (born 1962), Lithuanian architect and painter
Kęstutis Marčiulionis (born 1977), Lithuanian basketball point guard
Kęstutis Nakas (born 1953), American playwright, author, performer, director and teacher
Kęstutis Navickas (born 1984), Lithuanian badminton player and Olympic competitor
Kęstutis Rimkus (born 1953), Lithuanian politician
Kęstutis Ruzgys (born 1962), Lithuanian football forward
Kęstutis Šapka (born 1949), Lithuanian high jumper and Olympic competitor
Kęstutis Šeštokas (born 1976), Lithuanian basketball power forward
Kęstutis Smirnovas (born 1976), Lithuanian mixed martial artist
Kęstutis Stoškus (born 1951), Lithuanian architectural photographer and museum curator

Lithuanian masculine given names